Wafa is the news agency of the Palestinian National Authority

Wafa or WAFA may also refer to:

 West African Football Academy, Ghanaian football club
 West Australian Football Association, the original name of the West Australian Football League
 Wafa (TV series), a 2016 Pakistani drama television series
 Wafa: A Deadly Love Story, a 2009 Bollywood film
 Wafa Movement, a Tunisian political party
 Wafa Sultan (born 1958), psychiatrist and author known for her criticism of Islam
 Wafaa (name), a common Arabic name
 Wafaa (party), an Algerian political party

See also
Bewafaa (disambiguation)